Piotr Tworek (born 10 March 1975) is a Polish football manager who most recently managed Ekstraklasa club Śląsk Wrocław.

Managerial career
He took over as Warta's manager in June 2019 with the stated mission of avoiding the club's relegation from I Liga (the second tier of Polish football). To the surprise of many pundits, with Tworek in charge, Warta Poznań returned to the Polish Ekstraklasa (the top tier of the Polish football league system) in 2020, after being absent for 25 years.

However, Warta's next campaign in Ekstraklasa saw them struggling from the beginning, as they only managed one win and eight points in thirteen games. Due to this poor start, Tworek was dismissed on 2 November 2021.

On 9 March 2022, he was announced as the new manager of another Ekstraklasa side Śląsk Wrocław. With Tworek in charge, Śląsk managed only one win and six draws in ten league games. Despite avoiding relegation, he was relieved of his duties on 25 May 2022.

References

1975 births
Living people
Polish football managers
Zawisza Bydgoszcz managers
Warta Poznań managers
Śląsk Wrocław managers
Ekstraklasa managers
I liga managers
II liga managers
People from Radziejów County